Galatasaray Athletics Team is the men's and women's athletics section of Galatasaray S.K., a major sports club in Istanbul, Turkey.

Some Notable Athletes

 Şehit Celal (First Turkish Athlete)
 Silifkeli Şükrü Halil Dölek
 Fuat Salih
 Rıza Salih
 Vildan Aşil Savaşır
 Ömer Besim Koşalay
 Semih Türkdoğan
 Mehmet Ali Aybar
 Naili Moran
 Cezmi Or
 Eşref Aydın
 Jerfi Fıratlı
 Cahit Öner
 Şükrü Çaprazlı
 Suat Hayri Ürgüplü
 Turhan Kahraman
 Temel Erbek
 Murat Akman
 Teoman Smith
 Ahmet Karadag
 Ahmet Melek
 Murat Ayaydin

Technical staff

Current squad

Men's squad

 A-Team
 Kamil Ulaş Öğünç 
 Erdem Güler
 Batuhan Eruygun
 Furkan Hasan Can (Captain) 
 Mikail Yalçın
 Samet Özdemir
 Mustafa Alpçin
 Aykut Tanrıverdi
 Kutay Kırmızı
 Ali Dereli
 Ahmet Bektaş
 İbrahim Dereli
 Hasan Güler
 Gökhan Arslan
 Koray İmrak
 Fatih Çakmak
 Hakan Karakuş
 Turgay Çabukel
 Mustafa Kıvanç

 Youth Team
 Tugay Levent (Captain)
 Hazar Ilgaz
 Hasan Emir Kırmızı
 Yıldırım Alkan
 İmran Atmaca
 Murat Gültekin
 Okan Bağcı
 Hüseyin Oruçsuz
 Sami Tolga Korkmaz
 Şener Sağlam
 Feyyaz Akça
 Muhammet Maviş
 Artam Diren

 Team Starlets and Under 16 Team
 İbrahim Şan (Starlets Team Captain)
 Mustafa Yavuz (Under 16 Team Captain)
 Samet Barış Avcu
 Mehmet Baykent
 Met Baş
 Yahya Tedbirli
 Ömer Özmen
 İlyas Saban
 Ali Özgür Çakmak
 Erhan Çetin
 Emrah Akbacak
 Yağız Temur
 Melik Çamur
 Muhammet Tok
 Mustafa İnan
 Batuhan
 Erdi Can Kıvılcım
 Bayram Yiğit
 Mert Uğur Savaş
 Umut Uçar
 Mehmet Buğra Gündoğmuş

Women's squad

 Merve Aydın (born 1990), middle-distance
  Nilay Erkal (born 1999), long-distance

Honors
 Turkish Athletics Championship: Winners (27) (Record)
 1924, 1927, 1932, 1933, 1951, 1966, 1967, 1968, 1969, 1970, 1971, 1972, 1973, 1974, 1975, 1976, 1977, 1978, 1979, 1980, 1981, 1982, 1983, 1986, 1987, 1988, 1989
 Istanbul Championship: Winners (31) (Record)
 1924, 1925, 1926, 1927, 1931, 1933, 1941, 1942, 1945, 1951, 1963, 1965, 1966, 1967, 1968, 1969, 1970, 1971, 1972, 1973, 1974, 1975, 1976, 1977, 1978, 1979, 1980, 1981, 1982, 1983, 1986
 Turkish Athletics League: Winners (1) 
 1988
 European Youth Athletics Championship:
 1995 Belgium: (4.)
 1996 Turkey:(2.)
 1997 Croatia:(4.)

References

External links
 Galatasaray SK Official Web Site 

Galatasaray Athletics
Athletics clubs in Turkey
Sport in Istanbul
Running clubs in Turkey